This article is about the album Bootleg by Canadian blues group Downchild Blues Band. For the album by Kenshi Yonezu, see Bootleg (Kenshi Yonezu album). 

Bootleg is the debut album from the Canadian blues group the Downchild Blues Band released in 1971.

Having been rehearsing and playing live shows since 1969, the band proceeded to create one of Canada's earliest independent records. Recorded over two nights in 1971 in a makeshift studio at Toronto's Rochdale College, Donnie Walsh and others distributed the album by hand. It was also welcomed by major Toronto music retailer Sam Sniderman of Sam the Record Man renown, who was very much disposed to promoting Canadian music. The record was soon acquired by RCA Records Canada for more general distribution. It reached number 62 in Canada in May 1972.

Track listing
 "Rock It" – 3:57
 "Just a Little Bit" – 3:02
 "Down in Virginia" – 3:30
 "That's All Right" – 4:50
 "Messin' With The Kid" – 3:18
 "Don't You Bother My Baby" – 4:01
 "Change My Way of Livin'" – 5:04
 "You Don't Have to Go" – 3:04
 "Next Time You See Me" – 2:20
 "I'm  Sinkin'" – 2:45

Personnel
Don Walshguitar
Rick (The Hock) Walshvocals
Jim Milnebass
Cash Walldrums
Dave Woodwardtenor saxophone
Ron Jacobstenor and baritone saxophones

Production
Executive producer: Bleakney-McConnell
Direction: Dick Flohil
Recording studio: Sound Horn (Toronto)
Recording engineer: Bill Bryans
Sound & Mix: Alan Duffy
Art Direction: Bleakney - McConnell
Cover photo: Larry Nicols

References

External links
Downchild Bluesband official website

1971 debut albums
Downchild Blues Band albums